Amy Joanne Robach (born February 6, 1973) is an American television reporter formerly for ABC News. She is best known as co-anchor of 20/20 and as the breaking news anchor/fill-in anchor for Good Morning America. Robach first entered national television by working for NBC News from August 2003 to May 2012. She served as a national correspondent for NBC News from 2003 to 2007, and became co-host of the Saturday edition of NBC's Today as well as anchor on MSNBC from 2007 to 2012.

From May 2012 to January 2023, Robach worked for ABC News. She was a contributor for Good Morning America from May 2012 until March 2020, when she became the host of Pandemic: What You Need to Know, a show created in response to the COVID-19 Pandemic. The show would later become GMA3: What You Need to Know, which she co-hosted from September 2020 to December 2022. Robach also served as co-anchor of 20/20 alongside David Muir from May 2018 until January 2023.

Early life
Born in St. Joseph, Michigan, Robach grew up in East Lansing, Michigan, before moving to St. Louis, Missouri. Her family moved again to Georgia, where she attended high school and college. She graduated from Brookwood High School in Snellville, Georgia, and from the University of Georgia with high honors in broadcast journalism. She was 4th runner-up in the 1995 Miss Georgia pageant.

Career 
Robach started her career at WCBD in 1995. Robach then left the station in 1999, and started working at WTTG in Washington, D.C., then moved to MSNBC in 2003 where she spent four years, including a stint anchoring two hours in the morning, and filling in on Weekend Today, Countdown with Keith Olbermann and Morning Joe. She was named co-anchor of Weekend Today in July 2007. Her last day on Weekend Today was May 19, 2012, when she announced she would be moving to ABC News.

Robach initially appeared on ABC's Good Morning America as a correspondent. She became the show's news anchor on March 31, 2014. In 2018, Robach became the new co-anchor of 20/20.

In March 2020, Robach began hosting Pandemic: What You Need to Know on ABC, a daytime program initially focused on the COVID-19 pandemic in the United States, and airing in place of Strahan, Sara & Keke. The program later replaced Strahan, Sara & Keke indefinitely as GMA3: What You Need to Know, with Robach continuing as host. Robach was removed from GMA3 in December 2022 after it was revealed that she was having an affair with her married co-anchor T. J. Holmes.

Jeffrey Epstein story
On November 2, 2019, Project Veritas released a late August 2019 "hot mic" incident in which Robach discusses ABC shutting down her story on billionaire convicted sex offender and accused sex trafficker Jeffrey Epstein in 2015. Robach's comments came just two days after an NPR story disclosed the existence of an on-camera interview with Virginia Roberts Giuffre and ABC's failure to broadcast it. Giuffre says she was sexually trafficked by Epstein to powerful men including Prince Andrew, Duke of York — a claim the Duke has strenuously denied. In a "hot mic" video, Robach was recorded on set for ABC's Good Morning America voicing the following statements:

"I've had the story for three years," Robach says in the video. "We would not put it on the air. Um, first of all, I was told, 'Who was Jeffrey Epstein? No one knows who that is. This is a stupid story.' Then the palace found out that we had her whole allegations about Prince Andrew and threatened us a million different ways." Robach goes on to say that Giuffre alluded to others in the interview, including former President Bill Clinton, Harvard University law professor emeritus Alan Dershowitz and Epstein's former girlfriend, Ghislaine Maxwell. Giuffre has made similar accusations against all of them also in court documents. (All deny any wrongdoing or involvement in Epstein's sex trafficking.) Giuffre has said in court papers that she saw Clinton in Epstein's presence but did not witness Clinton participate in any sexual activity.

"I tried for three years to get it out to no avail, and now these new revelations and — I freaking had all of it," Robach says on the tape. "I'm so pissed right now. Like, every day I get more and more pissed, 'cause I'm just like, 'Oh my God! It was — what we had, was unreal.' "

Robach further stated: “One of the reasons an interview with Roberts was not broadcast was because, we were so afraid we wouldn’t be able to interview Kate and Will, so I think that had also quashed the story.”

Robach responded to the leaked video with this statement: "As a journalist, as the Epstein story continued to unfold last summer, I was caught in a private moment of frustration. I was upset that an important interview I had conducted with Virginia Roberts didn’t air because we could not obtain sufficient corroborating evidence to meet ABC’s editorial standards about her allegations. My comments about Prince Andrew and her allegation that she had seen Bill Clinton on Epstein's private island were in reference to what Virginia Roberts said in that interview in 2015. I was referencing her allegations—not what ABC News had verified through our reporting. The interview itself, while I was disappointed it didn't air, didn't meet our standards. In the years since, no one ever told me or the team to stop reporting on Jeffrey Epstein, and we have continued to aggressively pursue this important story."

ABC News issued a statement, asserting: "At the time, not all of our reporting met our standards to air, but we have never stopped investigating the story. Ever since, we’ve had a team on this investigation and substantial resources dedicated to it. That work has led to a two-hour documentary and 6-part podcast that will air in the new year."

T.J. Holmes affair 
On December 5, 2022, Robach, along with her GMA3 co-host T. J. Holmes, were taken off the air following the public disclosure of a romantic relationship between the two.

On January 27, 2023, both Robach and Holmes were fired from ABC News as a result of their relationship.

Personal life

Family
Robach is a cousin of former Nashville Star contestant Matt Lindahl. Her aunt and uncle were performing-arts teachers at her high school.

Robach was married to Tim McIntosh from 1996 until filing for an uncontested divorce in 2008. They have two daughters, Ava (2002) and Analise (2006).

Robach became engaged to former Melrose Place star Andrew Shue in September 2009, after meeting him at a book party the previous April. They were married on Robach's 37th birthday, February 6, 2010, at The Lighthouse at Chelsea Piers, adjacent to the Hudson River. It was reported she and Shue separated in August 2022, after it was discovered Robach was having an affair with her GMA3 co-anchor T. J. Holmes.

Health
On November 11, 2013, Robach revealed on Good Morning America that she had been diagnosed with breast cancer after receiving a mammogram on live television on October 1, 2013, and after undergoing follow-up tests. She took time off from broadcasting to undergo a bilateral mastectomy. On November 22, 2013, Robach revealed that during the surgery, doctors found a second malignant tumor in her other breast and that the cancer had spread to her lymph nodes (classified as Stage IIB). She then underwent eight rounds of chemotherapy, radiation and reconstructive surgery. As of March 2022, Robach was cancer free.

See also
 New Yorkers in journalism

References

External links
 
  – Amy meets Bela Karolyi

American television reporters and correspondents
American television news anchors
1973 births
Living people
ABC News personalities
NBC News people
People from St. Louis
People from Snellville, Georgia
University of Georgia alumni
20th-century American journalists
21st-century American journalists